Pityohyphantes costatus, the hammock spider, is a species of sheetweb spider in the family Linyphiidae. It is found in the United States.

Subspecies
These two subspecies belong to the species Pityohyphantes costatus:
 (Pityohyphantes costatus costatus) (Hentz, 1850)
 Pityohyphantes costatus annulipes (Banks, 1892)

References

Linyphiidae
Articles created by Qbugbot
Spiders described in 1850